"World on Fire" is a song by Canadian singer-songwriter Sarah McLachlan. It was released in June 2004 as the third single from her Afterglow album (2003).

Background and writing
McLachlan wrote the song in the wake of the September 11 attacks.

Music video
The video was directed by Sophie Muller. It opens with the claim of having cost $150,000, despite the ensuing low-quality footage of a barefoot McLachlan in a plain room playing her guitar. The video continues to reveal it actually cost $15, then tracking (in animated and videotaped segments) how the remainder went to enriching lives all around the globe through charitable donations.

Track listing
CD MaxiSingle
 "World on Fire" – 4:22
 "World on Fire" (Live Version) – 4:16
 "World on Fire" (Junkie XL Radio Mix) – 3:46
 "World on Fire" (Solarstone "Afterhours" Mix) – 8:42
 "World on Fire" enhance video – 4:22

UK Promo
 "World on Fire" – 4:22
 "World on Fire" (Junkie XL Radio Mix) – 3:46

US Promo
 "World on Fire" (Junkie XL Radio Mix) – 3:46
 "World on Fire" (Radio Mix) – 4:28
 "World on Fire" – 4:23
 Call Out Hook – 0:10

US Promo (Vinyl)
 "World on Fire" (JXL Club Mix) – 12:24
 "World on Fire" (JXL Club Mix Edit) – 6:28
 "World on Fire" (Marius De Vries Mix) – 4:49

CAN Promo
 "World on Fire" (Junkie XL Radio Mix) – 3:46
 "World on Fire" (Tom Lord Alge Radio Mix) – 4:25
 "World on Fire" – 4:22
 "World on Fire" (Junkie XL Mix Show Edit) – 6:25

UK Promo (Vinyl)
 "World on Fire" (JXL Club Mix) – 12:24
 "Stupid" (Hyper Mix)

Charts

Additional information
The eleven charitable organizations McLachlan chose to donate the production costs of the World On Fire are Carolina for Kibera, Comic Relief, CARE USA, DORCAS, Engineers Without Borders (Canada), Help the Aged, Film Aid, War Child, Heifer International, ITDG, and Action Aid.
The video was inspired by a letter from an Engineers Without Borders (Canada) volunteer.
A remix of the song by Junkie XL was featured on the soundtrack of FIFA Soccer 2005.

Notes

External links

Media That Matters page on the video

2004 singles
Music videos directed by Sophie Muller
Sarah McLachlan songs
Arista Records singles
Nettwerk Records singles
Songs written by Sarah McLachlan
Songs written by Pierre Marchand
2003 songs